Kubutz or qubbutz (modern ; , formerly , qībūṣ) and shuruk ( ) are two Hebrew niqqud vowel signs that represent the sound . In an alternative, Ashkenazi naming, the kubutz (three diagonal dots) is called "shuruk" and shuruk is called "melopum".

Appearance
The kubutz sign is represented by three diagonal dots "◌ֻ" underneath a letter.

The shuruk is the letter vav with a dot in the middle and to the left of it. The dot is identical to the grammatically different signs dagesh and mappiq, but in a fully vocalized text it is practically impossible to confuse them: shuruk itself is a vowel sign, so if the letter before the vav doesn't have its own vowel sign, then the vav with the dot is a shuruk and otherwise it is a vav with a dagesh or a mappiq. Furthermore, the mappiq only appears at the end of the word and only in the letter He (ה) in modern Hebrew and in the Bible it sometimes appears in aleph (א) and only in some Bible manuscripts it appears in the letter vav, for example in the word גֵּוּ ('torso') . Compare for example vav with dagesh in מְגֻוָּן  'varied' (without niqqud: מגוון) as opposed to shuruk in מִגּוּן  'protection' (without niqqud: מיגון); see also orthographic variants of waw.

Name
In older grammar books the kubbutz is called qibbûṣ pum etc. (קִבּוּץ פּוּם), compression or contraction of the mouth. This was shortened to qibbûṣ (also transliterated as kibbutz etc.) but later all the names of vowel signs were changed to include their own sound in their first syllable. This way kibutz changed to kubutz, and this is the common name today, although the name "kibutz" is still occasionally used, for example by the Academy of the Hebrew Language.

Shuruk was earlier called shureq (שׁוּרֶק), but this name is rarely used today.

Usage

Shuruk in modern texts
For details on the sounds of Hebrew, see Help:IPA/Hebrew and Hebrew phonology

The shuruk is used to mark  at the last syllable of the word and in open syllables in the middle of the word:
 שָׁמְרוּ ('they guarded') 
 חָתוּל ('cat') 
 תְּשׁוּבָה ('answer', Tshuva) 

Regardless of syllable type, shuruk is always written in foreign words and names if they weren't adapted to Hebrew word structure (mishkal):
 אוּנִיבֶרְסִיטָה ('university') 
 הַמְבּוּרְג ('Hamburg') 
 אוּקְרָאִינָה ('Ukraine')  (closed syllable)

Differently from all other niqqud signs, a shuruk can stand on its own in the beginning of the word and not after a consonant when it is the conjunction ו־ and. Hebrew one-letter words are written together with the next word and their pronunciation may change according to the first letters of that word. The basic vocalization of this conjunction is shva na (וְ־ ), but before the labial consonants bet (ב), waw (ו), mem (מ) and pe (פ), and before any letter with shva (except yodh) it becomes a shuruk (וּ־ ). This is the consistent vocalization in the Bible and in normative modern Hebrew, but in spoken modern Hebrew it is not consistently productive and the conjunction may simply remain וְ־ in these cases. It is not reflected in writing without niqqud. Examples:
 וּמִכְתָּב ('and a letter') 
 וּוֶרֶד ('and a rose') 
 וּסְפָרִים ('and books')

Kubutz in modern texts
Kubutz is used only in native Hebrew words and in words with foreign roots that were adapted to Hebrew word structure (mishkal), for example מְפֻרְמָט ('formatted (disk)')  (without niqqud מפורמט). It is written in closed syllables which do not appear at the end of the word. A closed syllable is one which ends in a consonant with shva nakh (zero vowel) or in a consonant with dagesh khazak (essentially two identical consonants, the first of which has shva nakh).

Kubutz in base forms of nouns
Common noun patterns in which kubutz appears in the base form are:
 /CuCCaC/ where the middle CC is a double consonant (with Dagesh): סֻלָּם ('scale') , אֻכָּף ('saddle') . Without niqqud: סולם‎, אוכף.
 /CuCCa/: חֻלְדָּה ('rat') , without niqqud: חולדה. To this pattern belong also the words whose roots' second and third letter are the same and merge into one consonant with dagesh: סֻכָּה ('hut', Sukka) , root ס־כ־כ, without niqqud: סוכה.
 /CəCuCCa/ where the last CC is a double consonant (with Dagesh): נְקֻדָּה ('point') . The Dagesh is not realized in modern Hebrew, but if the letter with the dagesh is bet (ב‎), kaph (כ‎) or pe (פ), then it is pronounced as a stop consonant: כְּתֻבָּה ('ketubba', 'prenuptial agreement') , חֲנֻכָּה ('housewarming', Hanukka) . Without niqqud: נקודה‎, חנוכה.
 /CuCCan/: שֻׁלְחָן ('desk') , without niqqud: שולחן.
 /CuCCoCet/ with Dagesh in the middle letter of the root: כֻּתֹּנֶת ('coat', 'garment') ; with a four letter root: גֻּלְגֹּלֶת ('skull') . Without niqqud: כותונת‏, גולגולת.
 /CuCCeCet/: כֻּסֶּמֶת ('spelt', 'buckwheat') , קֻבַּעַת ('goblet') . Without niqqud: כוסמת‏, קובעת.

Kubutz in declined forms of nouns
Common noun patterns in which kubutz appears in the declined form are:
 Declined forms of words, whose roots' second and third letter are the same, and which have a holam haser in the last syllable of their base form: דֻּבִּים ('bears') , the plural of דֹּב , root ד־ב־ב‎; כֻּלָּם ('all of them') , a declined form of כֹּל , root כ־ל־ל. All these words are written with vav in texts without niqqud: דובים‎, דוב‎, כולם‎, כול‎.
 Declined forms of words which have the pattern /CaCoC/ in the singular and become /CəCuCCim/ in the plural: צָהֹב ('yellow'), pl. צְהֻבִּים, עָגֹל ('round'), pl. עֲגֻלִּים. Without niqqud: צהוב, צהובים‎, עגול‎, עגולים‎. Exception: מָתוֹק ('sweet'), pl. מְתוּקִים, with holam gadol and shuruk and without dagesh.
 Some words, in the base form of which the penultimate syllable has  and is stressed (sometimes called seggolate), may be written with kubutz or with kamatz katan when declined. For example, base form: מַשְׂכֹּרֶת (wage); declined: מַשְׂכָּרְתָּהּ  or מַשְׂכֻּרְתָּהּ , both being normative spellings and pronunciations of her wage. Without niqqud, in any case: משכורת‎, משכורתה.

The plural form of words which end in ־וּת was in the past written with a kubutz in texts with niqqud: sg. חָנוּת ('shop'), pl. חֲנֻיּוֹת . In March 2009 the Academy decided to simplify the niqqud of such words by eliminating the dagesh in the letter yodh and changing the kubutz to shuruk: חֲנוּיוֹת‎. This doesn't change the pronunciation, since in modern Hebrew the dagesh is not realized anyway. The spelling without niqqud is also unchanged: חנויות.

Kubutz in verbs
Kubutz is common in verbs in the passive binyanim pual and huf'al and in some conjugated forms of verbs whose roots' second and third letters are the same.

Pual
Verbs and participles in the passive binyan pual usually have a kubutz in the first letter of the root: כֻּנַּס ('was gathered') , מקֻבָּל ('acceptable') , without niqqud: כונס‎, מקובל.

If the second letter of the root is one of the guttural consonants aleph (א), he (ה), ayin (ע) and resh (ר) - but not heth (ח) -, the kubutz changes to holam haser in a process called tashlum dagesh (תשלום דגש‎): יְתֹאַר ('will be described') , מְדֹרָג ('graded') ; without niqqud: יתואר‎, מדורג.

Huf'al
Kubutz is used in the prefixes of verbs and participles in the passive binyan Huf'al: הֻרְדַּם ('was put to sleep') , מֻסְדָּר ('organized') . It is also correct to write words in this binyan with kamatz katan in the prefix: הָרְדַּם‎, מָסְדָּר. Without niqqud, in any case: הורדם‎, מוסדר.

The kubutz is used only if the prefix is a closed vowel, which is the majority of cases. With some root patterns, however, it becomes an open vowel, in which case a shuruk is written:
 Roots whose first letter is yodh (י‎): הוּטַב ('become better') , root י־ט־ב‎; הוּרַד ('brought down') , root י־ר־ד.
 Roots whose middle letter is waw (ו) or yodh (י‎): הוּקַם ('erected') , root קום‎; הוּבַן ('understood') , root בין.
 Roots whose second and third letter are the same: הוּגַן ('protected') , root גננ.

In many roots whose first letter is nun (נ) and in six roots whose first two letters are yodh (י) and tsade (צ), this letter is assimilated with the second letter of the root, which in turn takes a complementary dagesh. This makes the syllable of the prefix closed, so accordingly the prefix takes kubutz: הֻסַּע ('driven') , root נסע‎; הֻצַּג ('presented') , root יצג. Without niqqud: הוסע‎, הוצג.

Double roots
Kubutz appears in some conjugated forms of verbs with roots whose second and third letter are the same (also called double stems and ע"ע). Most of them are rarely used.

Examples with verb סָבַב ('turn')  in the future tense of binyan qal:
 אֲסֻבֵּךְ  (1 sg. with possessive suffix)
 תְּסֻבֶּינָה  (3 pl. f.)

In older texts
In the Bible shuruk and kubutz are not always used according to the above consistent rules and sometimes quite arbitrarily. For example, in  appear the words: וּמְשֻׁבוֹתַיִךְ תּוֹכִחֻךְ ('and your backslidings shall reprove you'). Kubutz is used in both of them, even though in the first word the syllable is not closed and the vav is even a part of this word's root, and in the second word the  sound is in the last syllable. Contrariwise, a shuruk is used in closed syllables where a kubutz would be expected, for example in  - עֲרוּמִּים ('naked', the plural of עָרֹם), instead of the more regular עֲרֻמִּים (in modern Hebrew without niqqud: ערומים).

The word נְאֻם (speech) is written with kubutz in the Bible. It was previously frequently used to mark the signature on documents (e.g. נאם יוסף לוי - 'so says Yosef Levi'), but this usage is rare in modern Hebrew, where this word usually means "(a delivered) speech" and is regularly spelled with shuruk - נְאוּם. The name יְהוֹשֻׁעַ ('Joshua') is spelled with kubutz in the Bible, but usually יְהוֹשׁוּעַ in modern Hebrew.

In the first decades of the revival of the Hebrew language it was common in spelling without niqqud not to write the vav in words which were written with kubutz. For example, in the printed works of Eliezer Ben-Yehuda the word מרבה may mean מְרֻבֶּה ('multiplied') and מַרְבֶּה ('multiplying'). This practice disappeared in the middle of twentieth century and now מְרֻבֶּה is written מרובה and מַרְבֶּה is written מרבה.

Pronunciation
In Biblical Hebrew both signs may have indicated the same sound and when the Bible manuscripts were vocalized kubutz was simply used where the letter vav was not written, although other possibilities were proposed by researchers, most commonly that the vowels had different length (quantity), kubutz being shorter, or that the signs indicated different sounds (quality), kubutz being more rounded, although this is a matter of debate. It is also possible that Biblical Hebrew had several varieties of  sounds, which were not consistently represented in writing.

Shuruk is usually a reflection of reconstructed Proto-Semitic long  (ū) sound, although most likely in the Bible kubutz stands for it when the letter vav is not written. Kubutz is one of the reflections of the short Proto-Semitic short  (ŭ) sound. Kamatz katan is a variant of kubutz in the Bible, as they are found in complementary distribution in closely related morphological patterns.

In modern Hebrew, both signs indicate the phoneme , a close back rounded vowel. Its closest equivalent in English is the "oo" sound in tool. It is transliterated as a "u".

In modern Hebrew writing without niqqud the  sound is always written as waw, in which case it is considered a mater lectionis.

The following table contains the pronunciation of the kubutz and shuruk in reconstructed historical forms and dialects using the International Phonetic Alphabet.

Vowel length comparison
These vowels lengths are not manifested in modern Hebrew. In addition, the short u is usually promoted to a long u in Israeli writing for the sake of disambiguation.

Unicode encoding

See also
 Niqqud

References

Niqqud